This is a timeline of the history of Port Harcourt, the capital of Rivers State, Nigeria.

19th century

20th century

 1925 - Braithwaite Memorial Hospital begins operating.
 1961 - Roman Catholic Diocese of Port Harcourt established.
 1965 - Port Harcourt Refining Company founded.
 1971 - Newspaper The Tide begins publication.
 1972 
 Rivers State College of Science and Technology opens.
 Sharks football club formed.
 1975 
 University College, Port Harcourt created
 Port Harcourt Zoo established.
 1977 - University College gains University status becomes University of Port Harcourt.
 1980 
 Rivers State University of Science and Technology replaces Rivers State College of Science and Technology.
 University of Port Harcourt Teaching Hospital in operation.
 1981 - Radio Rivers begins broadcasting.
 1984 - Rivers State School of Basic Studies commences in Port Harcourt.
 1985 - Rivers State Television inaugurated.
 1988 - Dolphins football club is founded.
 1993 - Sister-city relationship with Kansas City formed.
 1995 - Ken Saro-Wiwa and Ogoni Nine buried in Port Harcourt Cemetery.
 1996 - Meridian Hospital begins operating.
 1999 - Rivers State School of Basic Studies revamped and renamed to Rivers State College of Arts and Science.

21st century

 2001 - Liberation Stadium opens.

 2004 
 Population: 1,133,400.
 National Network newspaper begins publication.
 2005 - Sosoliso Airlines Flight 1145 crashes.
 2006
 Port Harcourt International Airport stop operations for maintenance.
 Population: 1,382,592.
 2008 
 Garden City Literary Festival begins.
 Street Rhymes Studios in business.
 2009 - Port Harcourt International Airport named Nigeria's third busiest airport.
 2010 - Bus electrocutions accident.
 2011 - 91.7 FM begins broadcasting.
 2012 
 Port Harcourt selected 2014 World Book Capital.
 Massacre of four Uniport students.
 2013 
 Kelsey Harrison and Rivers State Dental and Maxillofacial hospitals start to function.
 I'm on Fire becomes most successful mixtape by a Port Harcourt-based artist.
 Port Harcourt International Fashion Week begins.
 Garden City Literary Festival gets new name: Port Harcourt Book Festival.
 2014 - Port Harcourt World Book Capital takes place.

See also
 Timelines of other cities in Nigeria: Ibadan, Kano, Lagos

References

Bibliography

External links

 
Port Harcourt
Port Harcourt
Port Harcourt-related lists